Suzy Kellems Dominik (born 1961) is a multi-disciplinary artist and emotional autobiographer known for her fearlessly confrontational work. The deliberately feminist themes she explores are realized through various mediums and serve to dissect the most intimate moments of human relationships.

Drawing on the endlessly expressive qualities of film, performance, photography, and sculpture, Kellems Dominik explores objectification and the male gaze, human trauma, female sexuality, agency, and her own experience of loss and survival. Driven by a mission to speak to broad and diverse audiences and striving to disrupt the dogmas of the contemporary art market, Kellems Dominik’s work has been exhibited internationally both within and beyond the white-cube space of the traditional art gallery.

Kellems Dominik has exhibited solo presentations at One Brooklyn Bridge Park with Chashama (New York), The Laundry (San Francisco), Ludlow House (New York), Onishi Project (New York), LaCuna Art Studios (Chicago), and at Coup d’Etat (San Francisco). Her sculptural installations have been exhibited internationally in collaboration with the PUBLIC Hotel (Chicago), the Nautilus Hotel (Miami), and the Freehand Hotel (Miami). Kellems Dominik has further presented her work on the international art fair circuit, including with the Armory Show (New York), Scope Art Fair (Miami), the Tokyo International Art Fair (Tokyo), the Affordable Art Fair (New York).

Her first major public art installation was “I Can Feel” exhibited during Art Basel Miami Beach 2017. The work is composed of a neon sculpture and choreographed light performance, and Kellems Dominik’s largest neon work. Standing at 12′ tall, the 27.68 second neon performance illuminates the rising emotion and viscerally glorifies the female orgasm.

Kellems Dominik lives and works between San Francisco, California, New York, New York, and Jackson, Wyoming.

Artwork Overview

Themes 
Prompted by her 50th year of life, Kellems Dominik launched her artistic career with an investigation into conventional definitions of feminism, social justice and individual liberty. Kellems Dominik seeks to encourage the amplification of strong female voices with a focus on self-empowerment, pleasure, and the private-made-public. Her extensive and varied body of work is underscored by a profound empathy for the vulnerability of the human condition and for the principles that underlie our efforts to connect, communicate, and commune.

Kellems Dominik’s work is characterized by her diligent research of our culture’s visual traditions, societal taboos, religious legacy, and the body of the individual. She often uses her own body to expose rigidly antiquated social constructs and to examine the role of female sensuality and agency in subversion of patriarchal social and aesthetic conventions.

Noteworthy Bodies of Work

I Can Feel 
"I Can Feel" is a visually arresting neon sculpture and choreographed light performance. Standing at 12 feet tall, the 27.68-second neon performance illuminates with rising emotion and viscerally glorifies the female orgasm in its overt monumentality.

Described as a work of emotional autobiography, the sculpture’s central feature is a 5’ 3.5” vagina, a number that symbolically represents the artist’s height.  The viewer basks in an effusive pink and blue neon glow as the choreography elicits the warmth of human touch and the vindication of emotional redemption.

The title of the work describes a self-affirmation, a personal breakthrough experienced in the wake of a mourned relationship, wherein the subject has progressed beyond the stages of grief to proclaim the achievement of self-empowerment and to ultimately embrace both physical and spiritual joy.

The work has been exhibited at The Nautilus Hotel on Miami Beach, with Chashama at One Brooklyn Bridge Park, and at Ludlow House New York.

BADASSERY 
As an ongoing tenet of her practice, Kellems Dominik develops a series of affirmative statements, colloquialisms, words, and phrases that are the emotional and intellectual scaffolding for her work collectively known as Badassery.  These poems act as artist statements for each of her respective bodies of work.

Beginning in 2019, the Badassery poems were activated both alone and in collaboration with an independent dance troupe assembled by the artist. Together the performers layered both choreographed and improvisational gestures and movements to the words of the Badassery poems. The artist documents the performances via simultaneous videography including 360-degree GoPro video, aerial drones, and hand-held cameras. The series remains ongoing.

The original Badassery prints have been exhibited at The Laundry, San Francisco in 2019, with the Tokyo International Art Fair in May 2015, and at the Affordable Art Fair New York in 2014.  The new body of Badassery poems have been activated with independent dancers, including with the Fullstop Dance troupe as part of the artist’s solo exhibition.  In spring 2019, a preview of the new performance series was presented for the SF MoMA Spring Fling in association with their Modern Art Council patron group.

You Are Dead to Me 
"You Are Dead to Me" is an ongoing project exploring ritualistic grief. The undertaking emerged as an outgrowth of the artist’s personal relationship to the process of mourning. The project is physically located in Jackson Hole, Wyoming and entails the methodical collection and numbering of 7,368 stones collected from the surrounding landscape. Stones of various size and weight were first hand-numbered by the artist in white Japanese ink and then placed strategically in numerical order in the form of an orderly grid. Following this months-long process, the artist constructed a rudimentary assemblage of PVC and V-struts to transport the stones across an active estuary to a small spit in the middle of the river. The artist arranged the stones in the form of a primitive tomb with a ceremonial promenade leading to the pinnacle of the grave.

Exposed to the elements of the seasons and submerged beneath feet of snow, the work withstood for months before resurfacing below the spring run-off. Subjected to the velocity of the river’s undercurrent the grave was inevitably overtaken, destabilized, and reconfigured. The artist remains in the midst of recovering the stones that comprised the original formation.

In August of this year, the artist endeavored to return to the artwork site to excavate the stones now distributed across the riverbed. A number have been recovered — many of which remain rooted in their original foundational location — yet many have yet to be rediscovered. The project is ongoing, yet already there emerges an understanding that while time may affect the surface, the truth is that grief remains rooted in the psyche as does the weight of stone.

“This idea of maybe one or two items would be left behind like with our grief; it’s an analogy for my grief, you still wear it, just somewhere different,” Kellems Dominik tells Women’s Wear Daily in 2019.

INVISIBLE 
"INVISIBLE" is a monumental installation featuring five, eleven-foot female soft-sculpture totems rendered in cotton-knit and wool. The sculpture pays symbolic homage to representations of the female body throughout art history — most notably the likes of the Venus of Willendorf and the caryatids atop Greece’s Erechtheion.

Like the caryatids, the unique visages and bodies of Kellems Dominik’s soft-sculptures reflect the physical affliction of time, disease, trauma, and pain. The totemic females of INVISIBLE nonetheless reclaim their physicality to stand tall and unabashed, showcasing individual particularities of the aging female body brazenly in the nude.

"INVISIBLE" was exhibited at the Nautilus Hotel, Miami Beach during Art Basel Miami Beach in 2018 and with The Laundry, San Francisco in 2019 for the artist’s solo exhibition An Excavation.

Speaking Engagements

Tracing Feminism 
Tracing Feminism was an all-female panel discussion organized in conjunction with the New York debut of Suzy Kellems Dominik’s "I Can Feel."

Featured panelists traced representations of the female throughout art history, from the ancient to the contemporary. Delving further, panelists explored themes pertaining to equity and equal representation in the arts, symbolically mining the cultural archives, and embarking upon an investigation of alternative artistic practices, and non-profit art models that exist in the name of gender parity, equal opportunity, and visibility of the female experience.

The panel launched anew the discourse surrounding "I Can Feel", extending themes of female creative representation into a richly layered discussion featuring panelists Jasmine Wahi, co-founder of Project for Empty Space in New Jersey and the Holly Block Social Justice Curator of the Bronx Museum, Kathleen Wentrack of QCC CUNY and The Feminist Institute, and artist Suzy Kellems Dominik.

Artful Storytelling 
Artful Storytelling was an all-female panel discussion that took place during Miami Art Week in complement to the artist’s installation INVISIBLE. Featured panelists explored storytelling across various platforms, including visual art and digital media, and evolving modes of artist representation and the trends, both digital and analog, in the industry.

The panel discussion comprised the following panelists: business strategist, social media consultant, and founder of the Realization Podcast, Idalia Salsamendi; Founder and Principal Advisor of the Yeelen Group, Karla Ferguson; and visual artist Suzy Kellems Dominik.

The panel was moderated by Founder and Editor-in-Chief at Art Zealous and founder of House of Puff, Kristina Adduci.

Collaborations

Dangerous Dance (Donated to Watermill Center Summer Benefit Auction) 
"Dangerous Dance" (2016) is a self portrait and time-based performance, a work of emotional autobiography consisting of a silent film structurally built upon a musical eight count. Through silence, the video invites viewers to project their own “internal soundtrack” onto the performance. "Dangerous Dance" comprises a body of work exploring and addressing the fundamental human need to be seen, heard, and valued in celebration of individuality. The short film draws inspiration from the esteemed choreographer Mark Morris, whose unbridled interpretation of what dance can be is embodied by Kellems Dominik and her collaborators.

"Dangerous Dance" was exhibited at Coup D'État San Francisco in 2016 and a limited edition set of film stills with the accompanying video were donated to the Watermill Center Summer Benefit in 2019 as part of their benefit auction held in collaboration with Artsy.

Past Exhibitions

Beatrice: To Hell and Back 
"Beatrice – To Hell and Back" is a multimedia, multidisciplinary contemporary re-imagination of Dante Alighieri's Divine Comedy and La Vita Nuova (1295) encapsulating the bitter irony of virtue and vice, rendered from the female perspective.

The installation takes as its subject the moment in 1295 when Dante defines Beatrice as “beatific,” not because of who she is, but how she mirrors how he feels about himself.  The artwork proceeds to retell the narrative from the point of view of Beatrice, a central character who acts as a foil for the vices exemplified by Dante’s host of characters in the Inferno. The jumping-off point is the famous quote:, “Abandon all hope ye who enter here.” The exhibition centerpiece is a gilded sculptural goat — Beatrice — who represents the artist’s alter ego poetically objectified. Ultimately, "Beatrice: To Hell and Back" is a maximalist experience — a simultaneously lush and luxuriant tirade on contemporary vanity, virtue, vice, and theatrics.

"To Hell and Back" was exhibited at Onishi Project New York in 2014.

In Her Dreams 
"In Her Dreams" is the third in a trio of multi-sensory installations dissecting human interaction, relationships, and expectations. The artwork explores the relationship between a young woman and her bed.

"The bed serves as a partner – a reservoir for her hopes, dreams, and disappointments. I invite you to touch and investigate the many layers of the bed and to take photos in and amongst the sheets. For the truly adventurous, strip the bed down to the mattress cover, to where all implied promises go to die – in a wet spot."

"In Her Dreams" exhibited at Freehand Hotel Miami during the 2015 Art Basel Miami Beach, Coup D'État San Francisco in 2016, and at Éléphant Paname in Paris through "Condizione" curated by Prada architect Robert Baciocchi in 2018.

Hateful Love 
An early incarnation of Kellems Dominik's signature Badassery series, "Hateful Love" communicates the polarity of love through striking text and soft, delicate imagery. "Hateful Love" exhibited at SCOPE Art Show, during the 2015 Art Basel Miami Beach.

Box of Sin 
"Box of Sin" is the first work in a series of micro installations exploring the Seven deadly sins. The project integrates sculpture, multi-media photographic images, the written word, and a layered soundtrack. Produced in collaboration with Coup d'État, San Francisco 2014.

Bear Attack: The Urban Bear 
In 2014, Kellems Dominik celebrated her first gallery exhibition with a body of work entitled "Bear Attack", the first in a trio of multi-sensory installations exploring the interpersonal relationships between men and women. The show combined a large-scale photographic triptych, the written word, a multi-layered soundtrack, video, taxidermy, and a cabinet of curiosities.

The artwork was inspired by a sign seen in a national park, “Be alert. Make noise. Carry bear spray. Avoid hiking alone. Do not run.” Kellems Dominik found direct parallels to rape culture and the experience of being a woman; she sought to expose “the bears” that walk among us.

“Terror is explored through three phases of a young woman’s life: youth, young adulthood, and established womanhood. Despite the young woman’s intelligence, worldliness, and command of her environment, she is unable to protect herself emotionally and/or physically from the insidious nature of the “Bear.” Love, hope, desire, need, and longing are perverted into something dangerous, terrifying, and unexpected."

The exhibition went on to show at Onishi Project and at Ian Schrager's Public Hotel in Chicago in 2014.

References

External links 

 

Living people
American artists
American philanthropists
1961 births